MATV may refer to:
 Midlands Asian Television, a broadcaster in Leicester, England
 MAtv, a network of community channels in Quebec
 Satellite Master Antenna Television, a system by which (usually) one entire large building is fed from one common set of antennas
 Oshkosh M-ATV, a military vehicle